The 1953 Pittsburgh Steelers season was the franchise's 21st in the National Football League.

Regular season

Schedule

Game summaries

Week 1 (Sunday September 27, 1953): Detroit Lions 

at Briggs Stadium, Detroit, Michigan

 Game time: 
 Game weather: 
 Game attendance: 20,675
 Referee: 
 TV announcers:

Scoring drives:

 Detroit – Carpenter 73 interception (Walker kick)
 Pittsburgh – Nickel 14 pass from Finks (Bolkovac kick)
 Detroit – Gedman 1 run (Walker kick)
 Detroit – FG Walker 40
 Pittsburgh – Mathews 1 fumble run (Bolkovac kick)
 Detroit – Hart 49 pass from Layne (Walker kick)
 Detroit – Walker 8 pass from Hoernschmeyer (Walker kick)
 Detroit – Hoernschemeyer 29 pass from Layne (Walker kick)
 Pittsburgh – Nickel 15 pass from Marchibroda (Bolkovac kick)

Week 2 (Saturday October 3, 1953): New York Giants  

at Forbes Field, Pittsburgh, Pennsylvania

 Game time: 
 Game weather: 
 Game attendance: 31,500
 Referee: 
 TV announcers:

Scoring drives:

 New York Giants – Clay 2 pass from Conerly (Clay kick)
 Pittsburgh – Chandnois 93 kick return (Bolkovac kick)
 New York Giants – Long 55 pass from Conerly (Clay kick)
 Pittsburgh – FG Bolkovac 35
 Pittsburgh – Nickel 4 pass from Finks  (Bolkovac kick)
 Pittsburgh – Bolkovac 14 fumble run (Bolkovac kick)

Week 3 (Sunday October 11, 1953): Chicago Cardinals  

at Forbes Field, Pittsburgh, Pennsylvania

 Game time: 
 Game weather: 
 Game attendance: 25,953
 Referee: 
 TV announcers:

Scoring drives:

 Chicago Cardinals – Olszewski 1 run (Summerall kick)
 Pittsburgh – Rogel 1 run (Bolkovac kick)
 Chicago Cardinals – Nagler 34 pass from Root (Summerall kick)
 Chicago Cardinals – Nagler 6 pass from Root (Summerall kick)
 Chicago Cardinals – Stonesifer 3 pass from Trippi (Summerall kick)
 Pittsburgh – Mathews 19 pass from Finks (Bolkovac kick)
 Pittsburgh – Rogel 4 run (Bolkovac kick)
 Pittsburgh – Barker 4 pass from Finks (Bolkovac kick)
 Pittsburgh – FG Bolkovac 28

Week 4 (Saturday October 17, 1953): Philadelphia Eagles  

at Connie Mack Stadium, Philadelphia, Pennsylvania

 Game time: 
 Game weather: 
 Game attendance: 18,681
 Referee: 
 TV announcers:

Scoring drives:

 Philadelphia – Pihos 28 pass from Burk (kick blocked)
 Pittsburgh – Mathews 23 pass from Finks (Bolkovac kick)
 Philadelphia – FG Walston 11
 Philadelphia – Giancanelli 16 pass from Thomason (Walston kick)
 Philadelphia – Ziegler 1 run (Walston kick)

Week 5 (Saturday October 24, 1953): Green Bay Packers  

at Forbes Field, Pittsburgh, Pennsylvania

 Game time: 
 Game weather: 
 Game attendance: 22,918
 Referee: 
 TV announcers:

Scoring Drives:

 Pittsburgh – Finks 4 run (Bolkovac kick)
 Pittsburgh – FG Bolkovac 40
 Pittsburgh – Chandnois 6 run (Bolkovac kick)
 Pittsburgh – Brandt 2 run (Bolkovac kick)
 PIttsburgh – Brandt 1 run (Bolkovac kick)
 Green Bay – Parilli 1 run (Cone kick)
 Green Bay – Cone 5 pass from Rote (Cone kick)

Week 6 (Sunday November 1, 1953): Philadelphia Eagles  

at Forbes Field, Pittsburgh, Pennsylvania

 Game time: 
 Game weather: 
 Game attendance: 27,547
 Referee: 
 TV announcers:

Scoring Drives:

 Philadelphia – Gianganelli 7 run (Walston kick)
 Philadelphia – Williams 48 run (Walston kick)
 Philadelphia – Walston 21 pass from Thomason (Walston kick)
 Pittsburgh – Mathews 11 pass from Finks (Bolkovac kick)
 Philadelphia – Pihos 26 pass from Thomason (Walston kick)
 Philadelphia – Giancanelli 8 pass from Thomason (Walston kick)

Week 7 (Sunday November 8, 1953): Cleveland Browns  

at Cleveland Municipal Stadium, Cleveland, Ohio

 Game time: 
 Game weather: 
 Game attendance: 35,592
 Referee: 
 TV announcers:

Scoring Drives:

 Pittsburgh – FG Bolkovac 27
 Pittsburgh – Mathews 2 run (kick failed)
 Cleveland – Carpenter 7 run (Groza kick)
 Cleveland – FG Groza 20
 Cleveland – Renfro 44 run (Groza kick)
 Pittsburgh – Mathews 77 pass from Finks (Bolkovac kick)
 Cleveland – Renfro 79 blocked field goal return (Groza kick)
 Cleveland – Lavelli 17 pass from Graham (Groza kick)
 Cleveland – FG Groza 14

Week 8 (Sunday November 15, 1953): New York Giants  

at Polo Grounds, New York, New York

 Game time: 
 Game weather: 
 Game attendance: 20,411
 Referee: 
 TV announcers:

Scoring Drives:

 Pittsburgh – Dodrill 16 fumble run (Bolkovac kick)
 New York Giants – Gifford 6 pass from Conerly (Gifford kick)
 New York Giants – FG Clay 20
 Pittsburgh – Butler 33 pass from Finks (Bolkovac kick)

Week 9 (Sunday November 22, 1953): Cleveland Browns  

at Forbes Field, Pittsburgh, Pennsylvania

 Game time: 
 Game weather: 
 Game attendance: 32,904
 Referee: 
 TV announcers:

Scoring Drives:

 Cleveland – Renfro 54 pass from Graham (Groza kick)
 Pittsburgh – Finks 1 run (Bolkovac kick)
 Pittsburgh – Safety, Lahr tackled in end zone by Mathews
 Cleveland – FG Groza 50
 Cleveland – Brewster 31 pass from Graham (Groza kick)
 Cleveland – FG Groza 41
 Pittsburgh – Mathews 1 run (Bolkovac kick)

Week 10 (Sunday November 29, 1953): Washington Redskins  

at Forbes Field, Pittsburgh, Pennsylvania

 Game time: 
 Game weather: 
 Game attendance: 17,206
 Referee: 
 TV announcers:

Scoring Drives:

 Pittsburgh – Safety, Heath tackled by Ferry in end zone
 Washington – Taylor 5 pass from LeBaron (Dudley kick)
 Pittsburgh – Chandnois 5 run (Bolkovac kick)
 Washington – FG Dudley 41
 Washington – Rykovich 5 pass from LeBaron (Dudley kick)

Week 11 (Sunday December 6, 1953): Chicago Cardinals  

at Comiskey Park, Chicago, Illinois

 Game time: 
 Game weather: 
 Game attendance: 14,138
 Referee: 
 TV announcers:

Scoring Drives:

 Chicago Cardinals – Olszewski 1 run (Summerall kick)
 Chicago Cardinals – FG Summerall 12
 Pittsburgh – Brandt 1 run (Bolkovac kick)
 Pittsburgh – Nickel 6 pass from Mackrides (Bolkovac kick)
 Pittsburgh – Mackrides 2 run (Bolkovac kick)
 Chicago Cardinals – Paul 5 pass from Romanik (Summerall kick)

Week 12 (Sunday December 13, 1953): Washington Redskins  

at Griffith Stadium, Washington, DC

 Game time: 
 Game weather: 
 Game attendance: 22,057
 Referee: 
 TV announcers:

Scoring Drives:

 Washington – Dekker 34 pass from LeBaron
 Washington – FG Dudley 39
 Washington – FG Dudley 20
 Pittsburgh – Chandnois 23 lateral from Mathews (Bolkovac kick)
 Pittsburgh – Butler 5 interception (Bolkovac kick)

Standings

References

Pittsburgh Steelers seasons
Pittsburgh Steelers
Pitts